The 1993–94 Quebec Nordiques season was the Nordiques' 22nd season of operation and its 15th in the National Hockey League (NHL). The Nordiques failed to qualify for the 1994 Stanley Cup playoffs.

Off-season

Regular season

Final standings

Schedule and results

Playoffs

Player statistics

Awards and records

Transactions
The Nordiques were involved in the following transactions during the 1993-94 season.

Trades

Waivers

Free agents

Draft picks
Quebec's draft picks at the 1993 NHL Entry Draft held at the Quebec Coliseum in Quebec City, Quebec.

Farm teams

See also
1993–94 NHL season

References

External links
 

Q
Q
Quebec Nordiques seasons
1993 in Quebec
1994 in Quebec